Marianne Meye Thompson is an American theologian, currently the George Eldon Ladd Professor of New Testament at Fuller Theological Seminary.

She was one of the translators for the Gospel of John for the New Living Translation Bible.

Works
 Thompson, Marianne Meye. 1-3 John. Vol. 19. InterVarsity Press, 1992.
 
 Achtemeier, Paul J., Joel B. Green, and Marianne Meye Thompson. Introducing the New Testament: Its literature and theology. Wm. B. Eerdmans Publishing, 2001.
 Thompson, Marianne Meye. The God of the gospel of John. Wm. B. Eerdmans Publishing, 2001.
 Thompson, Marianne Meye. Colossians and Philemon. Vol. 12. Wm. B. Eerdmans Publishing, 2005.
 Thompson, Marianne Meye. "The Gospel of John and early Trinitarian thought: the unity of God in John, Irenaeus and Tertullian." Journal of Early Christian History 4, no. 2 (2014): 154-166.
 Thompson, Marianne Meye. John: A commentary. Westminster John Knox Press, 2015.
 Thompson, Marianne Meye. "Reflections on joy in the Bible."  In Joy and human flourishing: Essays on theology, culture, and the good life, ed. by Miroslav Wolf (2015): 17-38. Fortress Press.

References

Year of birth missing (living people)
Living people
Fuller Theological Seminary faculty
American theologians
Female Bible Translators